David Bloom (1963–2003) was an American TV journalist and reporter.

David Bloom may also refer to:

David Bloom (Canadian) (born 1943), CEO of Shoppers Drug Mart
David E. Bloom (born 1955), American academic
 David Bloom (musician) (born 1954), American guitarist, flautist and composer
 David P. Bloom (born 1964), American criminal and fraudster